Smerki is a Yam language spoken in Rawu Biru, Tomer, Tomerau, and Yakiw in southeast Merauke Regency, Indonesia. Bârkâli (Barkari) and Smärki may be distinct enough to count as separate languages. The Tamer language is closely related.

References

Tonda languages
Languages of western New Guinea